Cache, caching, or caché may refer to:

Places

United States
 Cache, Idaho, an unincorporated community
 Cache, Illinois, an unincorporated community
 Cache, Oklahoma, a city in Comanche County
 Cache, Utah, Cache County, Utah
 Cache County, Utah
 Cache Peak (Idaho), a mountain in Castle Rocks State Park

Other places
 Cache, Aosta, a frazione in Italy
 Cache Creek (disambiguation), several places

Arts, entertainment and media
 Caché (album), a 1993 album by Kirk Whalum
 Caché (film), a 2005 film directed by Michael Haneke

Science and technology
 Cache (biology) or hoarding, a food storing behavior of animals
 Cache (computing), a collection of data duplicating original values stored elsewhere on a computer, usually for easier access
 InterSystems Caché, a database management system from InterSystems

Other uses
 Cache (archaeology), artifacts purposely buried in the ground
 Geocaching, an outdoor treasure-hunting game which involves looking for containers of varying sizes called geocaches or caches
 Caché, Inc., a Florida women's apparel company once owned by Andrew Saul
 Benedikt de Caché (1740–1809), Austrian diplomat

See also
 
 
 
 
 Cachet, in philately, a design or inscription other than a cancellation or pre-printed postage
 Cash, money in the form of liquid currency